Gliese 806 is a star in the northern constellation of Cygnus, located about a degree to the southeast of the bright star Deneb. It is invisible to the naked eye with an apparent visual magnitude of +10.79. The star is located at a distance of 39.3 light years from the Sun based on stellar parallax. It is drifting closer with a radial velocity of −24.6 km/s, and is predicted to come to within  in ~198,600 years. The star hosts two known planetary companions.

The stellar classification of Gliese 806 is dM1.5, which indicates this is a small red dwarf star – an M-type main-sequence star that is generating energy through core hydrogen fusion. It is roughly three billion years old and is spinning with a projected rotational velocity of 0.46 km/s. The star has 42% of the mass and radius of the Sun. It is radiating 0.3% of the luminosity of the Sun from its photosphere at an effective temperature of 3,586 K.

Planetary system 
However, this candidate object was never confirmed.

More recently, observations by TESS have found a candidate transiting planet with a period of less than a day. In January 2023, this planet was confirmed and a second, non-transiting planet found via radial velocity observations. A third radial velocity signal was also found, but the study was unable to confirm it as having a planetary origin. All known planets are super-Earths, and the inner transiting planet Gliese 806 b is likely to be rocky.

See also 

 Gliese 521

References

M-type main-sequence stars
Suspected variables
Planetary systems with two confirmed planets

Cygnus (constellation)
0806
102401
4481
239332587